Brasilennea is a fossil genus of small to medium-sized air-breathing land snails, terrestrial pulmonate gastropods in the family Cerionidae. The genus is known only from the Brazilian Paleocene Itaboraí Basin, in Rio de Janeiro. The most characteristic feature of the genus is its two spiral furrows on the body whorl.

The generic name Brasilennea originally intended to imply that it is a Brazilian genus that is very similar and related to the African genus Ennea. This is no longer the case, however: while the genus was originally classified in the family Streptaxidae, Brasilennea was then later transferred to the family Cerionidae.

Species 
Species within the genus Brasilennea include:
 Brasilennea arethusae Maury, 1935 - type species of genus
 Brasilennea guttula Salvador & Simone, 2012
 Brasilennea minor Trindade, 1956

References 

Cerionidae
Paleocene gastropods
Paleocene animals of South America
Itaboraian
Paleogene Brazil
Fossils of Brazil
Fossil taxa described in 1935